Azenia procida is a moth in the family Noctuidae (the owlet moths) described by Herbert Druce in 1889. It is found in North America.

The MONA or Hodges number for Azenia procida is 9726.1.

References

 Lafontaine, J. Donald & Schmidt, B. Christian (2010). "Annotated check list of the Noctuoidea (Insecta, Lepidoptera) of North America north of Mexico". ZooKeys, vol. 40, 1–239.
 Lafontaine, J. Donald & Schmidt, B. Christian (2011). "Additions and corrections to the check list of the Noctuoidea (Insecta, Lepidoptera) of North America north of Mexico". ZooKeys, vol. 149, 145–161.

Further reading

External links

 Butterflies and Moths of North America

Amphipyrinae
Moths described in 1889